Alexandra Finder (born 12 July 1977) is a German actress. She appeared in more than thirty films since 1998.

Selected filmography

References

External links 

1977 births
Living people
German film actresses